Thomas Gubb (21 March 1875 – 10 October 1922) was a Cape Colony cricketer. He played in two first-class matches for Eastern Province in 1902/03.

See also
 List of Eastern Province representative cricketers

References

External links
 

1875 births
1922 deaths
Cricketers from Cape Colony
Eastern Province cricketers
People from Uitenhage
Cricketers from the Eastern Cape